Charles F. Hanke (September 26, 1853 – July 28, 1903) was a member of the Wisconsin State Assembly.

Biography
Hanke was born on September 26, 1853. He moved to Amherst, Wisconsin in 1868 before settling in Augusta, Wisconsin.

Career
Hanke was a member of the Assembly during the 1893 and 1895 sessions, but lost to Horace N. Polley as a candidate for the 1896 election. In addition, he was a member of the Augusta city council in 1888 and 1889 and chaired the Eau Claire County, Wisconsin board of supervisors in 1890, 1891 and 1892. He was a Republican.

References

External links

People from Amherst, Wisconsin
People from Augusta, Wisconsin
Republican Party members of the Wisconsin State Assembly
Wisconsin city council members
County supervisors in Wisconsin
1853 births
1903 deaths
19th-century American politicians